Heineken is a patronymic surname meaning "son of little Hein" (Henry). Notable people with the surname include:

 Agnes Heineken (1872–1954), German politician
 Carl Heinrich von Heineken (1707–1791), German art historian
 Christian Heinrich Heineken (1721-1725), German child prodigy
 Freddy Heineken (1923–2002), former president of the brewing company Heineken
 Gerard Adriaan Heineken (1841–1893), founder of the brewing company Heineken
 Karl Heineken (d. 1830), German physician and ornithologist
 Marie Heineken (1844–1930), Dutch painter

See also
 Heinecken, a surname 
 Anakin (surname)
 Johann David Heinichen (1683–1729), German Baroque composer

References

Dutch-language surnames
German-language surnames
Patronymic surnames